Grettisfærsla ('The Handing on of Grettir') is an Old Icelandic poem, preserved in a fragmentary state only in the manuscript Eggertsbók. The poem concerns a character called Grettir and is referred to in chapter 52 of Grettis saga. The poem is notable for its thematic focus on sex and the "indiscriminate sexuality" of its protagonist, expressed in direct, non-euphemistic language.

References

Further reading 

 

Old Norse poetry